The Perfect Find is an upcoming American romantic comedy film written by Leigh Davenport and directed by Numa Perrier. It is based on the book of the same name by Tia Williams. The film stars Gina Torres, Keith Powers, and Gabrielle Union, who is also a co-producer. 

The Perfect Find is scheduled to be released on June 23, 2023, by Netflix.

Plot 
Forty-year-old Jenna Jones makes a career change into the world of beauty journalism. She runs into problems when she realizes that her frenemy Darcy is her boss, and she soon starts a relationship with Darcy's son, Eric, the company's videographer.

Cast 
Per Deadline:

 Gabrielle Union as Jenna Jones
 Gina Torres as Darcy Vale
 Keith Powers as Eric
 La La Anthony as Elodie
 Aisha Hinds as Billie
 Janet Hubert as Monica
 Latoia Fitzgerald
 Remy Ma
 Diana Noris as Helena
 Phoenix Noelle
 Ts Madison
 Numa Perrier as Pearl Bailey

Production

Development 
On November 6, 2018, it was announced that Gabrielle Union would produce and star in The Perfect Find, a film adaptation of the 2016 novel by Tia Williams. Tommy Oliver and Codie Elaine Oliver are producing the film for Confluential Films and, Union is producing alongside them through her company I’ll Have Another. Stuart Ford's AGC Studios also produced with Ford, Greg Shapiro, Glendon Palmer, and Holly Shakoor Fleischer as executive producers. The screenplay was written by Leigh Davenport, creator of Run the World. Numa Perrier was named the director on June 12, 2020 at the same time it was announced that Netflix picked up the film.

Casting 
On December 16, 2020 the casting of Keith Powers as Union's co-lead was announced. On March 2, 2021, Niecy Nash was announced as a co-star, but on June 18, 2021, it was announced that Gina Torres had replaced Nash due to scheduling conflicts. La La Anthony, Janet Hubert, and Aisha Hinds were announced on June 23, 2021.

Filming 
Filming was scheduled to begin in 2019. However, plans to film were changed to begin in June 2021 in Hudson County, New Jersey and is scheduled to end in August. Filming began the week of July 19, 2021 in New York, in the boroughs of Harlem and Manhattan. Additional filming locations included Newark and Jersey City, New Jersey.

Release 
On January 18, 2023, it was reported that the film will be released in 2023. On March 14, 2023, it was announced the film would debut on Netflix on June 23, 2023.

References

External links 
 

Upcoming films
English-language Netflix original films
African-American romantic comedy films
Films based on American novels
Films shot in New Jersey
Upcoming English-language films
Upcoming Netflix original films
Films shot in New York City